Zavadiv is a village (selo) in Yavoriv Raion, Lviv Oblast (province) of Western Ukraine. It belongs to Yavoriv urban hromada, one of the hromadas of Ukraine.

Reference

Villages in Yavoriv Raion